The 400 metre individual medley competition of the swimming events at the 2015 World Aquatics Championships was held on 9 August with the heats and the final.

Records
Prior to the competition, the existing world and championship records were as follows.

Results

Heats
The heats were held at 09:30.

Final
The final was held at 17:47.

References

Men's 400 metre individual medley